Podkarpacka Kolej Aglomeracyjna (Subcarpathian Agglomeration Railways) is a regional rail operator in the Subcarpathian Voivodeship of Poland. The rail network was established in January 2021, and is still expanding.

The network was established so that regional centres within Subcarpathian Voivodeship can be connected to the capital Rzeszów with all-day two-way frequent services, complementing Polregio services.

Railway lines
There currently are 4 lines, all starting from Rzeszów Główny: 

 Rzeszów - Dębica
 Rzeszów  - Kolbuszowa
 Rzeszów  - Strzyżów nad Wisłokiem
 Rzeszów - Przeworsk

Future expansion
A 5th line to Rzeszów–Jasionka Airport is planned as well. However, as there currently exists no direct rail link to the airport, construction of a rail link is required for this project. The line will branch off the existing Rzeszów  - Kolbuszowa line, north of Zaczernie, and will have two new stations.

References

Railway companies established in 2021
Railway companies of Poland